Óscar Fernández Vigil (born 15 May 1978) is a Spanish judoka.

Achievements

References
 

1978 births
Living people
Spanish male judoka
Universiade medalists in judo
Universiade silver medalists for Spain
Medalists at the 2003 Summer Universiade
21st-century Spanish people